Bartolomé Serrano (born 5 March 1969 in Terrassa) is a retired Spanish long-distance runner who specialized in the half marathon.

He finished fourteenth at the 1998 World Half Marathon Championships in a personal best time of 1:01:43 hours.

External links

1969 births
Living people
Spanish male long-distance runners
Sportspeople from Terrassa
20th-century Spanish people